"Forever"  is a song recorded  by American singer-songwriter, and record producer Mariah Carey for her fifth studio album, Daydream (1995). It was released by Columbia Records on June 18, 1996, as an airplay-only single and the fifth single from the album. The song was written and produced by Carey and Walter Afanasieff, and was composed throughout 1995. Its lyrics describe a situation where the protagonist knows her relationship with her lover has withered away, however he will continue living in her memory forever.

The song's music video is a collage of snippets from Carey's shows at the Tokyo Dome, during her Daydream World Tour in 1996. Most of the video is the performance of the song during one of the three Japanese shows on the tour. Serving as an airplay only song in the US, and a limited release around the world, the song received a well amount of chart success specifically in the U.S.. In the United States, Billboard rules did not allow the charting of non-commercially released songs. For this reason, it did not chart on the Hot 100, however peaking at number two on the Adult Contemporary chart. Outside the US, the song peaked at number 11 in Canada, 40 in New Zealand and 44 in the Netherlands.

Composition

"Forever" was written and produced by Carey and Walter Afanasieff in early 1995. Composed in  time, the song is moves at a tempo of 63 beats per minute. Carey's vocal range spans two octaves and three semitones from the low note of E3 to the high note of F5. According to author Chris Nickson, the song's instrumentation and throw-back melody bring reminders of 1950s and 60s balladry. The throw-back was featured through the chord changes, and in the way that the guitar arpeggios "stayed at the forefront of the music." "Forever" finds Carey displaying subtle and harmonizing vocals, with Nickson describing her voice as "undeniably rich." Stephen Holden from The New York Times described it as a "50s-style rock-and-roll ballad," while calling Carey's voice "magnificent."

Reception
Larry Flick from Billboard wrote, "Within a retro-pop musical setting that is warmly reminiscent of her breakthrough hit, "Vision Of Love", Carey plays the romantic ingénue with convincing, wide-eyed innocence and infectious hope." Daina Darzin from Cash Box stated, "Carey's continuously-astounding voice is the focal point of this sweet, soaring ballad, featuring lush but unobtrusive orchestration serving as a respectful backdrop." Ken Tucker from Entertainment Weekly praised the song's instrumentation, adding, "I like the brisk waltz tempo of 'Forever'." In 2020, Billboard ranked it as the 100th greatest song of Carey's career. "Forever" was released as an airplay only single in the US, and received a limited European release. Due to Billboard rules at the time of its release, "Forever" wasn't eligible to chart on the Hot 100. However, the song charted on the Adult Contemporary chart, peaking at number two. In Canada, the song peaked at number 11 on the Canadian RPM Singles Chart issue dated September 30, 1996. In New Zealand, the song entered the singles chart at its peak of number 40, spending only one week in the chart. On the Dutch Singles Chart, "Forever" peaked at number 47, fluctuating in the chart for a total of nine weeks.

Music video and live performances
"Forever" was first performed in October 1995 in Carey's concert at Madison Square Garden. The next year it was performed throughout all the shows on Carey's Daydream World Tour in 1996. The music video for "Forever" was filmed at one of the Japanese shows during the tour. It presents Carey singing the song on stage at the Tokyo Dome, and inter-cuts scenes from other segments of the show. For the show and video, Carey wore a pair of black pants and matching blouse, together with a long leather trench coat. Her hair teased in a long wavy fashion, and is a golden-auburn color. The video features three back-up singers, one male and two female and a large projection screen on the stage's rear.  The live audio of this performance was released on the single.

Formats and track listing
 European CD single
 "Forever" – 4:01
 "Forever" (Live) – 4:12

 Australian CD single
 "Forever" – 4:01
 "Underneath the Stars" – 3:33
 "Forever" (Live) – 4:12
 "Make It Happen" (Live) – 4:43

Credits and personnel
Credits adapted from the Daydream liner notes.
 Mariah Carey – co-production, songwriting, vocals
 Walter Afanasieff – co-production, songwriting

Charts

Weekly charts

Year-end charts

Release history

References

Bibliography

 

1990s ballads
1996 singles
Mariah Carey songs
Songs written by Walter Afanasieff
Songs written by Mariah Carey
Pop ballads
Song recordings produced by Walter Afanasieff
1995 songs
Columbia Records singles
Sony Music singles
Contemporary R&B ballads